Shawn William Campbell (born March 18, 1961) is an American retired professional basketball player. He was drafted in 1985 by the Phoenix Suns. He played in college at Weber State University in Ogden, Utah.

Early years
Born in Boise, Idaho to Sonya and Bill Campbell, Campbell's ancestry is Scottish. He attended grade school at Crestview Elementary School before he moved on to Layton High School and graduated in 1979.

College career

He began his college career at Ricks College in Rexburg, Idaho (now Brigham Young University–Idaho) for a single year. After which, he went on a Mission (LDS Church) to Iceland for two years for the Church of Jesus Christ of Latter-day Saints. Upon returning, he had grown nearly two inches, gained nearly 25 pounds, and enrolled at Weber State University in the hopes of seeing time on the court.
 
During his senior year for the Weber State Wildcats men's basketball in 1984, he certainly saw time on the court. Campbell was the Wildcats leading scorer, averaging 16.9 points per game, 8.0 rebounds per game, and shooting 58% from the field. The Wildcats posted a 20–9 record and Campbell led the Big Sky Conference in blocks.

NBA draft

The Phoenix Suns drafted Campbell in the fifth round (102nd pick) of the 1985 NBA Draft. His draft rights were later renounced in September, 1988.

Basketball career

Campbell's basketball career centered around playing international ball. He played in the FIBA Club World Cup for the Continental-Coors All-Stars (CBA). He also spent time playing for the Florida Suncoast Stingers  as well as the VOO Wolves Verviers-Pepinster.

References

1961 births
Living people
American people of Scottish descent
Basketball players from Idaho
Brigham Young University–Idaho alumni
Centers (basketball)
Florida Stingers players
Junior college men's basketball players in the United States
Phoenix Suns draft picks
Sportspeople from Boise, Idaho
Weber State Wildcats men's basketball players
American men's basketball players
Latter Day Saints from Idaho
Mormon missionaries in Iceland
American Mormon missionaries